Washington's Tomb is an empty burial chamber two stories directly below the Rotunda of the United States Capitol building in Washington, DC. It was included in the original design of the building by William Thornton and intended to entomb the body of George Washington, the first President of the United States. The original design of the rotunda, and the Crypt beneath it, included a central glass floor allowing the public to view Washington's Tomb two floors below, but this was never implemented. 

When Washington died in 1799, the Capitol was still under construction. Both houses of Congress passed a resolution calling for Washington to be entombed in the Capitol upon its completion. His wife, Martha Washington, agreed to the plan despite the presence in her husband's will of a provision that he be buried at Mount Vernon. However, the original resolution was never carried out due to disputes over the specific design and cost of the tomb and the body was placed in a temporary tomb at Mount Vernon. Congress again attempted to resolve these issues in 1800, 1816, 1824, and 1829, when the Architect of the Capitol prepared plans for the tomb in anticipation of the approaching centennial of Washington's birth. 

Congress renewed its call to transfer the body to the Capitol in 1830, after an attempt to steal Washington's head in which the Mount Vernon tomb was vandalized and several of Washington's relatives' corpses desecrated in 1830. The current owner of the property, John Washington, decided to build a new, more secure tomb on the site instead.

Formerly, the Lincoln Catafalque was stored and exhibited in the tomb.  It is kept, at present, in a specially constructed display area in the Exhibition Hall of the Capitol Visitor Center.

See also
 United States Capitol crypt
 List of burial places of presidents and vice presidents of the United States

References

United States Capitol rooms
Monuments and memorials to George Washington in the United States
Tombs of presidents of the United States